Răzvan Vasile Cociș (born 19 February 1983) is a Romanian former footballer. He was usually an attacking midfielder but could play in a variety of other midfield positions as well as up-front. He was also well known for his close control.

Club career

Cociș is one of the graduates of the prolific school of football at Universitatea Cluj where, amongst other teammates, won a national youth title. After earning a regular first team spot at not even 21 years of age, there were rumours that clubs made offers for him, including Stade Rennais FC, but at the end of the season he was sold to Moldovan team Sheriff Tiraspol alongside another player of his generation, George Florescu.

He signed a contract that expired on 31 December 2009 with Lokomotiv, which cost Lokomotiv 2.6 million euros to sign. He scored his first goal in the Russian league against Rubin Kazan. His former clubs include U Cluj and Sheriff Tiraspol. He signed a three-month contract on 1 March 2010 with FC Timişoara until the summer, with option to renewal for 5 years. On 22 May, it was announced that Răzvan Cociș signed a contract with Saudi Arabian side Al-Nassr.

On 25 February 2011, he moved to Ukrainian club Karpaty Lviv on loan from Al-Nassr. He scored his first goal for Karpaty, in their 1–0 win over Shakhtar Donetsk. In June, he signed a permanent deal with Karpaty after the 2010–11 season.

On 14 July 2014 it was announced Cociș had joined Chicago Fire of Major League Soccer. He re-signed with the club on 23 January 2016. On 23 November 2016 Chicago Fire announced they did not exercise his option for the next year.

International career
Cociș made his national debut on 17 August 2005 against Andorra in a 2–0 win.

International goals

Personal
On 13 July 2015 Chicago Fire announced Razvan had received a US green card which qualifies him as a domestic player for MLS roster purposes.

Honours
Universitatea Cluj
Divizia C: 2000–01
Sheriff Tiraspol
Divizia Naţională: 2004–05, 2005–06, 2006–07
Moldovan Cup: 2005–06
Moldovan Super Cup: 2004, 2005
Lokomotiv Moscow
Russian Cup: 2007

References

External links

1983 births
Living people
Sportspeople from Cluj-Napoca
Romanian footballers
Romania international footballers
Romanian expatriate footballers
Expatriate footballers in Moldova
Expatriate footballers in Russia
Expatriate footballers in Ukraine
Expatriate footballers in Saudi Arabia
Expatriate soccer players in the United States
Romanian expatriate sportspeople in Russia
Romanian expatriate sportspeople in Ukraine
Romanian expatriate sportspeople in Saudi Arabia
Romanian expatriate sportspeople in the United States
FC Sheriff Tiraspol players
FC Lokomotiv Moscow players
FC Politehnica Timișoara players
FC Universitatea Cluj players
Al Nassr FC players
FC Rostov players
Chicago Fire FC players
Russian Premier League players
Liga I players
Ukrainian Premier League players
Major League Soccer players
UEFA Euro 2008 players
Saudi Professional League players
Moldovan Super Liga players
Association football midfielders